Hans Carl Nipperdey  (21 January 1895 in Berka – 21 November 1968 in Cologne) was a German labour law expert who worked as the president of the Federal Labour Court from 1954 to 1963. He was a controversial figure due to his close association with his complicit work with Nazi government from 1933, his membership of the Academy for German Law, and his work to systematise Nazi labour laws through his commentaries with Alfred Hueck.

Biography
Nipperdey became a Professor of labour law in 1925 at the University of Cologne. His work represented the conservative wing of labour law practice, joining criticism of Hugo Sinzheimer's early texts.

In 1933, he joined a protest against the dismissal of Hans Kelsen from the University faculty. He also collaborated in drawing up a list of Jewish students in the faculty.

Nipperdey joined the Nazi Academy for German Law when it was founded in 1933. He and Alfred Hueck wrote commentaries for the new Nazi labour laws, which had abolished trade unions and codetermination from 1934 onwards.

After the Second World War, Nipperdey rejoined the mainstream, and continued his work as a legal academic. In 1954 he was appointed by the conservative CDU government to become the president of the Federal Labour Court. During his time there he issued restrictive decisions on the right to take strike action, and refused to acknowledge that employees had any rights to their pension savings beyond the scope of the contract agreed with an employer.

Hans Carl Nipperdey was the father of the historian Thomas Nipperdey and the liberation theologian Dorothee Sölle.

Publications
 Festschrift für Justus Wilhelm Hedemann zum sechzigsten Geburtstag am 24. April 1938. / Hrsg.: Roland Freisler; George Anton Löning; Hans Carl Nipperdey. Jena: 1938
 Die Pflicht des Gefolgsmannes zur Arbeitsleistung, in: Deutsches Arbeitsrecht 1938
 Alfred Hueck; Hans Carl Nipperdey; Rolf Dietz. Gesetz zur Ordnung der nationalen Arbeit, Kommentar. 4. Aufl. München und Berlin 1943
 Die Ersatzansprüche für Schäden, die durch den von den Gewerkschaften gegen das geplante Betriebsverfassungsgesetz geführten Zeitungsstreik vom 27.-29. Mai 1952 entstanden sind. Rechtsgutachten, Schriftenreihe der Bundesvereinigung der Deutschen Arbeitgeberverbände Heft 9, Köln 1953
 Soziale Marktwirtschaft und Grundgesetz, Heymann, Köln, 1961
 Grundrechte und Privatrecht, Kreefeld 1961

References
 Klaus Adomeit, Hans Carl Nipperdey als Anreger für eine Neubegründung des juristischen Denkens, in: Stefan Grundmann, Karl Riesenhuber (Hrsg.), Deutschsprachige Zivilrechtslehrer in Berichten ihrer Schüler. Eine Ideengeschichte in Einzeldarstellungen, Band 1, Berlin 2007, S. 148-165.
 Rolf Dietz, Alfred Hueck, Rudolf Reinhardt (Hrsg.): Festschrift für Hans Carl Nipperdey : Zum 60. Geburtstag, 21. Januar 1955, Beck, München, 1955
 
 Thorsten Hollstein: Um der Freiheit willen – die Konzeption der Grundrechte bei Hans Carl Nipperdey, in: Thomas Henne/Arne Riedlinger (Hrsg.), Das Lüth Urteil aus (rechts-)historischer Sicht, Die Konflikte um Veit Harlan und die Grundrechtsjudikatur des Bundesverfassungsgerichts, Berlin 2005, S. 249–269.
 Thorsten Hollstein: Die Verfassung als 'Allgemeiner Teil': Privatrechtsmethode und Privatrechtskonzeption bei Hans Carl Nipperdey (1895-1968), Mohr Siebeck, Tübingen 2007.
 Bernd Rüthers: Geschönte Geschichten - Geschonte Biographien. Mohr Siebeck, Tübingen 2001.
 Dirk Neumann, Assistenten von Nipperdey, in: Peter Hanau, Jens Thau, Harm Peter Westermann (Hrsg.): Gegen den Strich. Festschrift für Klaus Adomeit, Köln 2008, S. 517-520.

1895 births
1968 deaths
Grand Crosses with Star and Sash of the Order of Merit of the Federal Republic of Germany
Members of the Academy for German Law
Nazis who committed suicide in Germany